Desiree Bjerke Andersen (born March 22, 1971, in Fredrikstad) is a Norwegian skeleton racer who has competed since 1997. She finished ninth in the women's skeleton event at the 2006 Winter Olympics in Turin.

Bjerke's best finish at the FIBT World Championships was 17th twice in the women's skeleton event (2005, 2007).

She competed at the 2010 Winter Olympics where she finished 17th.

External links
 2006 women's skeleton results
 
 Skeletonsport.com profile

1971 births
Living people
Norwegian female skeleton racers
Olympic skeleton racers of Norway
Skeleton racers at the 2006 Winter Olympics
Skeleton racers at the 2010 Winter Olympics
Sportspeople from Fredrikstad
20th-century Norwegian women
21st-century Norwegian women